Magda Bruggemann (born 12 May 1930) is a Mexican former swimmer. She competed in three events at the 1948 Summer Olympics.

References

External links
 

1930 births
Possibly living people
Mexican female swimmers
Olympic swimmers of Mexico
Swimmers at the 1948 Summer Olympics
Pan American Games medalists in swimming
Pan American Games bronze medalists for Mexico
Swimmers at the 1951 Pan American Games
Central American and Caribbean Games gold medalists for Mexico
Central American and Caribbean Games medalists in swimming
Competitors at the 1946 Central American and Caribbean Games
Competitors at the 1950 Central American and Caribbean Games
Medalists at the 1951 Pan American Games
People from Mexico City
20th-century Mexican women